Los Bukis (The Bukis, buki translates as Little Kid in the Yaqui language) are a Mexican Grupero  band from Ario de Rosales, Michoacan. In 1973, the band was founded by cousins Marco Antonio Solís and Joel Solís. Their first song was Falso Amor ("False Love") and its style became popular throughout Latin America. Marco Antonio wrote the songs; the album "Me Volvi a Acordar de Ti" in the year of 1986 sold one million records in just a few weeks after its launch, earning the album "diamond" status. He also wrote and produced albums for artists such as Marisela, Rocío Dúrcal, Beatriz Adriana, Lucero, El Pegasso de Emilio Reyna (now using the name El Pega Pega), and María Sorté.

After twenty years of success, in 1996, Marco decided to pursue a solo career. The band disbanded. An agreement was made with the remaining band members, under which both parties agreed to not make any use of the word "buki". The remaining members formed a new band called Los Mismos ("The Same Ones") as in "the same members of Los Bukis".

Reunion Tour 
After a 25-year hiatus, on May 9, 2021, Los Bukis reunited and released a re-recording and music video of their 1986 hit “Tú Cárcel” with Marco Antonio Solís, Joel Solis, Roberto Guadarrama, Eusebio Cortez, Jose Javier Solis, and Pedro Sanchez in the lineup. A few weeks later, Jose "Pepe" Guadarrama also rejoined the band. On June 14, 2021, Los Bukis were presented at SoFi Stadium and announced a reunion tour. They named the tour Una Historia Cantada. The tour was originally for only four dates, but expanded to nine due to high demand, performing mainly in California and Texas. They finished their tour in Oakland California on October 2, 2021. On February 9, 2022, Los Bukis announced a tour of stadium concerts in the US and Mexico. The final concert will be in Estadio Azteca in Mexico City on December 3, 2022. The Mexican tour contains a few select cities including a concert in their home state of Michoacán.

Band members
Current Members

 Marco Antonio Solís – lead vocals, guitar, timbales, occ. keyboard (1972–1996, 2021–present)
 Joel Solís – lead guitar, backing vocals (1972–1996, 2021–present)
 Roberto Guadarrama – 1st keyboard, backing vocals, bugle (1979–1996, 2021–present)
 Eusebio "El Chivo" Cortez – bass, backing vocals (1977–1995, 2021–present)
 José "Pepe" Guadarrama  – 2nd keyboards, percussion, backing vocals, saxophone (1988–1995, 2021–present)
 Pedro Sánchez – drums (1982–1996, 2021–present)
 José Javier Solís – percussion, backing vocals (1981–1988, 2021–present)

Former Members 

 Jorge Dávila – drums (1974–1982)
 Carlos Hernandez – bass (1976–1977) 
 Enrique "Kike" Gonzalez – bass (1974–1976)
 Fidel Arreygue – bass (1995–1996)
 Rodolfo "Fito" Luviano – 2nd keyboards (1995–1996)
 Victor Aguilar – percussion, backing vocals (1995–1996)

Discography

Studio albums 

1975: Falso Amor
1977: Te Tuve y Te Perdí
1978: Me Siento Solo
1979: Los Triunfadores
1980: Me Muero Porque Seas Mi Novia
1981: Presiento Que Voy a Llorar
1982: Yo Te Necesito
1983: Mi Fantasia
1985: A Donde Vas
1986: Me Volvi a Acordar de Ti
1988: Si Me Recuerdas
1989: Y Para Siempre
1991: A Través de Tus Ojos
1992: Quiéreme
1993: Inalcanzable
1995: Por Amor a Mi Pueblo

Compilation albums
 1989: Lo Romántico de Los Bukis
 1989: Juntos Otra Vez
 1998: Románticos de Corazón
 2006: 30 Recuerdos Inolvidables
 2011: 35 Aniversario
 2012: Iconos: Los Bukis 25 Exitos
 2016: Los Bukis

Films 
1983: Las Musiqueras
1990: Cómo Fui a Enamorarme de Ti

In other media
"Tu Cárcel" was covered by Mexican actress Michael Ronda and Karol Sevilla from the Disney Channel Argentine telenovela Soy Luna.

References 

Mexican musical groups
Musical groups from Michoacán
Fonovisa Records artists
Latin pop music groups
Musical groups established in 1975
Musical groups disestablished in 1994
Musical groups reestablished in 2021